George Choumnos (died after 1342) was a Byzantine statesman.

Biography 
George Choumnos was a younger son of the scholar and statesman Nikephoros Choumnos, and brother of the general and statesman John Choumnos. According to Rodolphe Guilland, he is possibly to be identified with the otherwise unknown megas stratopedarches Choumnos, attested in 1328. At that time, during the final stages of the Byzantine civil war of 1321–1328, he was the governor of Thessalonica and defended the city unsuccessfully against the forces of Andronikos III Palaiologos. He appears again in the late reign of Andronikos III, from 1337 on, holding the position of epi tes trapezes (head of the imperial table). He was evidently an influential person: his unnamed son had family ties to Andronikos III, and George himself is attested as speaking first in imperial councils, even before Andronikos III's close friend and aide, the megas domestikos John Kantakouzenos. In 1339, he is also attested as head (kephalatikeuon) of one of the districts of Constantinople.

In the civil war of 1341–1347 he remained loyal to Andronikos III's under-age son, John V Palaiologos, and opposed Kantakouzenos; as a reward, he was raised to the post of megas stratopedarches on the occasion of John V's coronation on 19 November 1341. One of his nieces even became the second wife of one of the chief leaders of John V's regency council, Alexios Apokaukos, but in late 1342 Choumnos fell out with Apokaukos when he pleaded in favour of making peace with Kantakouzenos, and was placed under house arrest. He is possibly to be identified with a monk named Gerasimos Choumnos, which would indicate that at some point soon after he was forced to retire to a monastery.

References

Sources
 
 
 

13th-century births
14th-century deaths
14th-century Byzantine people
Byzantine governors of Thessalonica
Byzantine officials
Byzantine prisoners and detainees
George
Megaloi stratopedarchai